Beaumont Hospital - Farmington Hills, formerly known as Botsford Hospital, is a 330-bed teaching hospital with level II trauma center status. Founded in 1965, the hospital is affiliated with Beaumont Health. The hospital earned three year accreditation from the American Osteopathic Association's Healthcare Facilities Accreditation Program in 2008.

History 

Dr. Allen Zieger opened his first hospital in 1944 in Detroit calling it the Zieger Osteopathic Hospital. In 1965, Zieger Osteopathic Hospital opened Botsford General Hospital at its current location on Grand River Avenue in Farmington Hills.

In March 2014, Botsford Hospital merged with Beaumont Health and was renamed Beaumont Farmington Hills Hospital.

On November 5, 2014, Beaumont Farmington Hills hospital announced a $160 million expansion project which includes an expansion of the hospital's Emergency and Trauma Center, construction of a new critical care unit and creation of a dedicated observation unit. In addition, the plan calls for expanding and modernizing surgical services with nine new operating rooms. The expansion would include a five-story, 80-bed tower. The project is currently under construction.

Medical education 
Beaumont Hospital - Farmington Hills is a teaching hospital for the training of osteopathic physicians. It is a base hospital for:

 Michigan State University College of Osteopathic Medicine (MSUCOM)
 Arizona College of Osteopathic Medicine  (AZCOM)
 Kansas City University of Medicine and Biosciences-College of Osteopathic Medicine (KCUCOM) 

Current Residency programs

Dermatology
Diagnostic Radiology
Emergency Medicine
Family Practice / OMM
Family Practice / NMM
General Surgery
Internal Medicine 
Neurology
Obstetrics and Gynecology
Orthopedic Surgery
Otorhinolaryngology and Orofacial Plastic Surgery
Plastic and Reconstructive Surgery 
Podiatry 
Urologic Surgery

Current Fellowships

Cardiology
Gastroenterology
Nephrology
Infectious Disease
Pulmonary / Critical Care Medicine
Spine Surgery

References

External links

 Botsford Hospital

Hotel buildings completed in 1965
Hospitals in Michigan
Osteopathic medicine
Buildings and structures in Oakland County, Michigan
Trauma centers